The Mercian (also known as 212 Broad Street by its address and formerly known as 2one2 Broad Street and Broad Street Tower) is a 132-metre-tall (433 ft) residential skyscraper on Broad Street in Birmingham, England. It is designed by Glenn Howells Architects, the developer is Moda Living and the main contractor is John Sisk & Son.

The build is valued at £183m and was completed in May 2022. 

The tower sits perpendicular to the street with the front-facing Five Ways. Originally, a helipad was proposed to be located on top of the building on a podium, but this was removed from the design, though the podium remained with some minor changes. 

The tower was scheduled to be presented before a planning committee in late August 2006. However, the developers pulled out minutes before the meeting to make changes.

The application was presented again on 28 September and whilst it was originally deferred due to lack of information, concerns over height and payment of money under Section 106, it was later approved. The updated proposal boasted a partial redesign, increasing the height of the tower and creating a redesigned façade. Construction of the skyscraper began in April 2019. 

The Mercian is the tallest building in Birmingham and the second tallest structure, after the BT Tower. However, this title is expected to be handed over to Octagon, a 49-storey skyscraper currently under construction and due for completion in 2025.

See also
List of tallest buildings and structures in Birmingham

References

External links
Levelseven Architects
Skyscrapernews.com
Broad Street skyscraper plans unveiled Birmingham Mail (22 Aug 2006)
Emporis entry
Comments on Broad Street Tower by CABE

Buildings and structures in Birmingham, West Midlands
Buildings and structures under construction in the United Kingdom